Alexander Dmitrievich Petrov (February 12, 1794 – April 22, 1867) was a Russian chess player, chess composer, and chess writer.

Petrov was born in Biserovo, near Pskov, into a noble family and is usually remembered as the first great Russian chess master. From 1804, he lived in Saint Petersburg. In 1809, he defeated Kopev and Baranov, Petersburg's leading chess players, and became the best Russian player at the age of 15. For over half a century Petrov was considered Russia's strongest player.

He is an author of the first chess handbook in Russian (Shakhmatnaya igra (...), St Petersburg 1824). He also analysed with Carl Friedrich von Jänisch the opening that later became known as the Petrov's Defense or Russian Game (C42).

From 1840 he lived in Warsaw (then in the Russian Empire), where successfully played against top Warsaw chess masters: Alexander Hoffman, Piotrowski, Szymański, Siewieluński, Hieronim Czarnowski, Szymon Winawer, etc.

Petrov won matches against D.A. Baranov (4–2) in 1809, Carl Jaenisch (2–1) at St Petersburg 1844; Prince Sergey Semenovich Urusov (3–1) at St Petersburg 1853 and (13.5–7.5) at Warsaw 1859; and Ilya Shumov (4–2) at St Petersburg 1862.

During the January Uprising (1863–1864), he left Warsaw for Vienna and Paris. Among others, he played a match with Paul Journoud at Paris 1863.

Petrov died in Warsaw in 1867, and was buried in the Orthodox Cemetery in Warsaw.

His most well-known problem is "The Retreat of Napoleon I from Moscow" (St. Petersburg 1824).

Notable games
Alexander Hoffman vs Alexander Petrov, Warsaw m 1844, Italian Game, Classical Variation, Center Attack (C53), 0-1 Petrov's Immortal
Alexander Petrov vs Carl Friedrich von Jaenisch, St Petersburg 1844, Russian Game, Modern Attack, Center Variation (C43), 1-0
Alexander Petrov vs Prince Dmitri Semenovich Urusov, Paris 1852, Italian Game, Classical Variation, Albin Gambit (C53), 1-0
Alexander Petrov vs Prince Sergey Semenovich Urusov, St Petersburg 1853, Italian Game, Classical Variation, Albin Gambit (C53), 1-0
Alexander Petrov vs Szymański, Warsaw 1853, French Defense, Exchange, Monte Carlo Variation (C01), 1-0

References

External links 

1794 births
1867 deaths
Chess players from the Russian Empire
Chess composers
Russian chess writers
Chess theoreticians
19th-century chess players
Privy Councillor (Russian Empire)